Sitalk Peak is a rocky peak of elevation 600 m in Levski Ridge, Tangra Mountains, Livingston Island in the South Shetland Islands, Antarctica.  Situated at the end of a side ridge rinning northwards from Great Needle Peak, and linked to a rocky part of that ridge featuring Tutrakan Peak to the south by a 100-metre long ice-covered saddle. Surmounting Huron Glacier and its tributaries to the north, east and west.  The peak is named after the Thracian King Sitalk, 431-424 BC.

Location

Maps
 L.L. Ivanov et al. Antarctica: Livingston Island and Greenwich Island, South Shetland Islands. Scale 1:100000 topographic map. Sofia: Antarctic Place-names Commission of Bulgaria, 2005.
 L.L. Ivanov. Antarctica: Livingston Island and Greenwich, Robert, Snow and Smith Islands. Scale 1:120000 topographic map.  Troyan: Manfred Wörner Foundation, 2009.

References
 Sitalk Peak. SCAR Composite Antarctic Gazetteer
 Bulgarian Antarctic Gazetteer. Antarctic Place-names Commission. (details in Bulgarian, basic data in English)

External links
 Sitalk Peak. Copernix satellite image

Tangra Mountains